Eucalyptus dawsonii, known as slaty gum or slaty box, is a species of small to medium-sized tree that is endemic to a small area of New South Wales. It has smooth, white, grey or yellow bark, sometimes with a short stocking of rough, flaky bark, lance-shaped to curved adult leaves, flower buds in groups of seven on a branching inflorescence, white flowers and conical to barrel-shaped fruit.

Description
It has smooth white, grey or yellow bark that is shred in short ribbons, sometimes with a short stocking of rough, flaky greyish bark. Flowering has been observed in March and November and the flowers are white.

Taxonomy and naming
Eucalyptus dawsonii was first formally described in 1899 by Richard Thomas Baker from a specimen he collected from "ridges on the watershed of the Goulburn River". The description was published in Proceedings of the Linnean Society of New South Wales. The specific epithet (dawsonii) honours "Mr. James Dawson, L.S., of Rylstone" who collected plant specimens in that area.

Distribution and habitat
Slaty gum mainly grows in tall woodland between Scone and the Capertee Valley.

References

dawsonii
Myrtales of Australia
Flora of New South Wales
Trees of Australia
Plants described in 1899
Taxa named by Richard Thomas Baker